Edwin Hubbell Chapin (December 29, 1814 – 1880) was an American preacher and editor of the Christian Leader. He was also a poet, responsible for the poem Burial at Sea, which was the origin of a famous folk song, Bury Me Not on the Lone Prairie.

Early years and education
Chapin was born in Union Village, Washington County, New York. He completed his formal education in a seminary at Bennington, Vermont. At the age of twenty-four, after a course of theological study, he was invited to take charge of the pulpit of the Universalist Society of Richmond, Virginia, and was ordained as a pastor in 1838. Two years afterward, he moved to Charlestown, Massachusetts, and in 1840 he accepted the pastorate of the School Street Society, in Boston. In 1848 he settled in New York as pastor of the Church of the Divine Paternity, later the Fourth Universalist Society in the City of New York, when the church was located on Broadway. There he served for over thirty years, drawing crowds of almost 2,000 each Sunday. Under his leadership, a new edifice was erected on the corner of 5th Avenue and 45th Street, and dedicated on the 3rd day of December, 1866.

Oratorical works
Chapin became widely known as an orator and author of works including the Crown of Thorns, Discourses on the Lord's Prayer, Characters of the Gospel, illustrating phases of the present day, Moral Aspects of City Life, and Humanity in the City. He spoke at Frankfort-on-the-Main, before the World's Peace Convention in 1850; at the Banquet for Lajos Kossuth; at the Publishers' Association Festival, and at the opening of the New York Crystal Palace. 
He touched upon ideas of American patriotism in his oration at the New York Crystal Palace on July 4, 1854

Poetry
He was the author of the poem Ocean Burial, which was put to music by George N. Allen.  The song which it became was published widely. It became a sailor's song and also the beginnings for another song, Bury Me Not on the Lone Prairie. He wrote the poem in his youth and it was published in June 1839 in The Universalist Union  and September 1839 in Poe's Southern Literary Messenger.

Society
He was a trustee of Bellevue Medical College and Hospital, and a member of: the State Historical Society, the beneficent society called the Independent Order of Odd Fellows, and the prestigious Century Club, composed of "authors, artists, and amateurs of letters and the fine arts. In 1854 he was elected into the National Academy of Design as an Honorary member.

Death
He died in Pigeon Cove, a village of Rockport, Massachusetts, survived by two sons, Frederic H. Chapin and Dr. Sidney H. Chapin, and one daughter, Marion Chapin Davison.  The Chapin Memorial Church at Oneonta, New York was dedicated to him in 1894. A chasm in the rocky coast near his home in Pigeon Cove is named Chapin's Gully where Chapin often practiced his orations and swam.

Recognition
He was one of the chief actors in what was called the "Broad Church Movement". Harvard College conferred an honorary D.D. upon Chapin in 1856.

Selected works
 1847 - The Crown of Thorns: A Token for the Sorrowing 
 1849 - Duties of Young Women 
 1853 - Moral Aspects of City Life: A Series of Lectures 
 1854 - Humanity in the City 
 1860 - Living Words 
 1872 - Discourses on the Lord's Prayer 
 1877 - Lessons of Faith and Life: Discourses 
 1881 - Gods̓ Requirements and Other Sermons

References

External links

 
 

1814 births
1880 deaths
People from Washington County, New York
Clergy of the Universalist Church of America
19th-century Christian universalists
Religious leaders from New York (state)
American male poets
American male non-fiction writers
American religious writers
Poets from New York (state)
19th-century American male writers
19th-century American poets
19th-century American non-fiction writers
19th-century American clergy
Members of the Odd Fellows